Nicolás Filiberti (born April 11, 1977 in Buenos Aires) is an Argentine racing driver.

He began his career in Formula Honda Argentina in 1994. He then went on to South American Formula Three.

In 1998 he traveled to Europe to compete in the Euro Open by Nissan with EC Motorsport, where he finished eighth with a victory. The following year he competed in Italian Formula 3000 with Durango Formula and participated in a round of the International F3000, although he failed to qualify.

In 2000 he finished ninth in the SportsRacing World Cup alongside Giovanni Lavaggi. The following year he returned to the International F3000 and Open by Nissan, race partially in both.

His last year in Europe was 2002, before returning to Argentina. In his country, he raced TC 2000 in those first two years and then moved on to Top Race V6, where he remained active until his retirement in 2011. That year he also participated in three Porsche Supercup races.

Racing record

Complete International Formula 3000 results
(key) (Races in bold indicate pole position) (Races in italics indicate fastest lap)

Complete Porsche Supercup results
(key) (Races in bold indicate pole position) (Races in italics indicate fastest lap)

References

1977 births
Living people
Racing drivers from Buenos Aires
Argentine racing drivers
Formula 3 Sudamericana drivers
International Formula 3000 drivers
American Le Mans Series drivers
TC 2000 Championship drivers
Top Race V6 drivers
Porsche Supercup drivers

Durango drivers